The Chattanooga Subdivision is a railroad line owned by CSX Transportation in the U.S. states of Tennessee, Alabama & Georgia. At its north end the line continues south from the Nashville Terminal Subdivision and at its south end the line continues south as the W&A Subdivision.

See also
 List of CSX Transportation lines

References

CSX Transportation lines
Rail infrastructure in Tennessee
Rail infrastructure in Alabama
Rail infrastructure in Georgia (U.S. state)
Transportation in Chattanooga, Tennessee